Tkibuli is a district of Georgia, in the region of Imereti. Its main town is Tkibuli. This area of Georgia is also known as Okriba, its historical and geographical name.

Population: 20,839 (2014 census).

Area: 479 km2.

Politics 
Tkibuli Municipal Assembly (Georgian: ტყიბულის საკრებულო) is a representative body in Tkibuli Municipality, consisting of 27 members and elected every four years. The last election was held in October 2021.

See also 
 List of municipalities in Georgia (country)

References

External links 
 Districts of Georgia, Statoids.com

Municipalities of Imereti